Drew Crevello is a writer and former film studio executive known for his work with Fox and Warner Bros. studios.

As a vice president of film production at Fox, Crevello developed films such as Deadpool and X-Men: First Class.

In 2019, Crevello sold sci-fi pilot script The Long Dark with Scott Free Productions attached to produce and Ridley Scott attached to direct. He co-created and co-wrote the miniseries WeCrashed starring Jared Leto and Anne Hathaway in 2022.

Crevello's long-term girlfriend is screenwriter Katie Dippold.

References

External links

Living people
American film producers
American film studio executives
Warner Bros. people
Year of birth missing (living people)